Stephen C. Schlesinger is an American historian, political commentator, and international affairs specialist. He is a Fellow at the Century Foundation in New York City. He served as director of the World Policy Institute at the New School University from 1997 to 2006. He was foreign policy advisor to New York State Governor Mario Cuomo during his three terms in office.

Background and education
Stephen Schlesinger was born on August 17, 1942. He is the son of historian and presidential biographer Arthur Schlesinger Jr. His mother, Marian Schlesinger, was a writer and portrait artist. He attended Browne and Nichols School and Phillips Exeter Academy, graduating in 1960. He earned a BA from Harvard University in 1964 in American History and Literature; a one-year certificate of study from Peterhouse at Cambridge University in 1965; and a J.D. from Harvard Law School in 1968. The Schlesinger Library at Harvard is named after his paternal grandparents, Arthur and Elizabeth Schlesinger.

Early career (1968–72)
Schlesinger began as a freelance writer investigating the 1967 Algiers Motel murders in Detroit and covering the 1968 Czechoslovakia uprisings against the Soviet occupation. Later he served as special assistant to Edward Logue at the New York State Urban Development Corporation from 1968 to 1969. The following year,  he began publishing, with other former supporters of Robert F. Kennedy and Eugene J. McCarthy, The New Democrat, a monthly magazine dedicated to uniting "the left and radical wings" and replacing the "dead leadership" in the Democratic Party. The magazine was critical of Democratic National Committee chairman Larry O'Brien, and promoted the candidacy of South Dakota Senator George McGovern over that of Maine Senator Ed Muskie and former Vice President Hubert Humphrey during the 1972 Democratic presidential primaries.

Journalistic career (1973–82)
Schlesinger became a columnist for The Boston Globe in 1974, writing the weekly "L't'ry Life" column about magazines and periodicals. From 1974 to 1978, he was a writer for Time Magazine in the Press Section and the National Affairs Section. In 1975, his book, The New Reformers, about the new political currents that grew out of the 1960s, was published. In 1978, he served as the chief political correspondent for The New York Post. In that same year, he wrote a piece for The Nation Magazine on the 1954 CIA coup in Guatemala which was a finalist for a National Magazine award. In 1982, he and co-author Stephen Kinzer published Bitter Fruit, a much acclaimed full-length account of the US intervention in Guatemala. Tony Blinken, Secretary of State in the Biden Administration, told Schlesinger that the book influenced President Bill Clinton to apologize to the people of Guatemala for US support of repressive military and intelligence forces in the country.

Governmental service (1983–94)

New York State Government

Schlesinger served as a speechwriter, liberal counsellor, and foreign policy advisor to New York State Governor Mario Cuomo, during his three terms in office. He accompanied Cuomo on his trip to the Soviet Union in 1987. In 1990, he became Director of International Organizations for New York State. He also served on the Cuomo Commission on Competitiveness in 1992.

Election monitoring missions

Schlesinger participated in election monitoring missions for National Democratic Institute (NDI), helping to oversee Bulgaria's first democratic election in 1990 after the fall of its Communist government; he participated in a second NDI mission in 1990 to monitor Guatemala's presidential election; and in 1993 he was an observer of Paraguay's presidential election as part of a NDI delegation led by former President Jimmy Carter.

United Nations (1995–96, 2003, et al)
Schlesinger worked at the United Nations Human Settlements Programme (UN-HABITAT, a United Nations agency for dealing with urban planning) as Special Advisor to its Director, Wally N'Dow, helping to organize the Habitat-2 Conference on global cities in Istanbul, Turkey. In 2003, he published a landmark study of the 1945 San Francisco Conference that founded the United Nations, entitled Act of Creation, which won the 2004 Harry S. Truman Book Award, given every two years. UN Secretary-General Kofi Annan invited him, as part of the Annan lecture series, to speak to the UN Secretariat about the book in 2006, where Nobel Prize winners Toni Morrison, Joseph Stiglitz and Desmon Tutu had also spoken. His remarks later appeared in Mr. Annan's 2013 book "The Brilliant Art of Peace", a collection of the Annan-sponsored lectures, published by the US Institute of Peace. He has appeared in ten documentaries on the UN.

Academic career (1997–2006, et al)

World Policy Institute

Schlesinger became Director of the World Policy Institute (WPI), a progressive foreign policy think-tank at The New School University, in 1997. In that capacity, he managed a million dollar budget, supervised 25 Senior Fellows, and organized extensive programming. He was also publisher of the institute's quarterly magazine, The World Policy Journal. He left the Institute in 2006.

Past teaching posts

Schlesinger was an instructor in composition at Harvard College in 1968; an adjunct professor at The New School University in American politics in 1976; a visiting scholar at New York University 1994–96; and an adjunct professor at the Columbia University School of International and Public Affairs in 2010. He lectures around the country and overseas.

Memberships
Council on Foreign Relations; Overseas Press Club; United Nations Correspondents Association; Century Association; PEN; Board of Governors, Roosevelt Institute; Selection Committee, British Atlantic Fellowships, 1995, 1996;
Selection Committee, Voice of America Cowan Award 1998; Author's Guild; listed in "Contemporary Authors", Wikipedia, Dictionary of International Biography, Who's Who In America, Who's Who In The World, Who's Who In The East; 
Judge for 2002 Robert Kennedy Book Awards; served as Principal For A Day at FLAGS High School in the Bronx, 4/19/02; Foreign Policy Association Fellow, 2004-on; Roosevelt Fellow, 2007; Member, Global Affairs Advisory Board, 
McKinnon Center, Occidental College; UN Alliance of Civilizations, Global Expert (2010–present); Honorary Chairperson, Frank Church Institute, Boise State University; Member, Int’l Advisory Bd of International Peace Institute; 
Member, Advisory Board of website PassBlue.com.

Author
Schlesinger's book, Bitter Fruit (1982), co-authored with Stephen Kinzer, about the 1954 US coup in Guatemala, garnered remarkable attention. Jim Miller in Newsweek  wrote that "Schlesinger's and Kinzer's meticulously documented history reads like a cloak-and-dagger thriller..." Warren Hoge in The Sunday New York Times Book Review called it "a tale of dirty tricks, the manipulation of public opinion, the smearing of the precious few journalists who managed to sense what was really going on and of foreign policy that borrowed more from Doonesbury than diplomacy." Antony Blinken, writing in "The Harvard Crimson", stated that "Bitter Fruit" is "an invaluable historical narrative" in which "the arrogance, callousness and stupidity of our countrymen is hard to swallow." Later Blinken, US Secretary of State during the Biden Administration, explained to Schlesinger that the book led to President Clinton's apology to the people of Guatemala for prior US security incursions in their country. "The Sunday New York Times Book Review" named it a "notable book of the year." The book is considered a classic study of American interventionism abroad and has sold more than 100,000 copies.

His subsequent book on the UN's founding, Act of Creation (2003), an account of the 1945 San Francisco conference that drafted the UN Charter, received the highest accolades. Robert Caro called it "an immensely valuable contribution to our understanding of one of the most pivotal events of the twentieth century..." The American Ambassador to the United Nations, Richard Holbrooke, writing in The Sunday New York Times Book Review, observed: "A superb book that reconstructs this drama with great lucidity and illuminates its contemporary relevance." The former NY Times UN correspondent, Barbara Crossette, called the book "the classic history of the founding of the UN". It won the 2004 Harry S. Truman Book Award.

In 2007, with his brother, Andrew, he edited his father's Journals 1952-2000 Arthur Schlesinger Jr. (2007) which covers Schlesinger's life through the second half of the twentieth century. The diaries became a best seller. In a front-page review in the Sunday New York Times Book Review, Maureen Dowd wrote Schlesinger was "unleashed" in his diaries and said that "It's hard not to like a book that expounds on Marilyn Monroe on one page and the Monroe Doctrine on the next." Janet Maslin in the daily New York Times observed: "This arch, irresistibly revealing book manages to be both show-stopping and door-stopping, what with its vast range of subject matter and unfettered private sniping... [T]his book creates a moving and monumental 48-year chronicle." Jonathan Alter in Newsweek remarked that the book "contains juicy morsels on every one of its 858 pages." In Salon.com, Sidney Blumenthal noted that "If the American century were cast as a Broadway show, this would be the playbill."

Subsequently, Schlesinger co-edited with his brother The Letters of Arthur Schlesinger Jr. (2013). The book earned broad critical praise. Ted Widmer in The Daily Beast proclaimed: "To re-enter the world of his correspondence is like a form of time travel, giving the reader access to the same vertiginous ride he was on, following the presidency and the course of American liberalism from its high-water mark under FDR, through its many peaks and valleys since then." The Literary Editor of The Chicago Tribune, Elizabeth Taylor, commented: "Nostalgia isn't the only reason to read these letters. Another is to be immersed in a world where someone cares deeply about ideas and people."

Documentary appearances
In Search Of Peace: 50 Years of the United States in the United Nations—a Turner Broadcasting System documentary (produced on October 23, 1995)

A Coup Made in America: on the 1954 US coup in Guatemala, produced by Canadian TV series “Turning Points in History” (1999)

Inside The Glass Building: Interviews with UN Secretaries-General – a Swiss documentary on the UN, produced by Kino Fur Morgen with English language version available at Films For The Humanities (2005)

Broken Promises—The United Nations at 60: narrated by Ron Silvers, produced by Peace River Company and Citizens United Foundation (2005)

A Workshop for Peace: (www.snagfilms.com)  produced by the UN's Department of Public Information (2005)

America's Senator: on Arthur Vandenberg at the SF Conference produced by International Pictures (2007)

Going Global With The UN: produced by Miller & Associates (2008)

Planet UN: The United Nations Confronting the Challenges of the 21st Century – a Swiss documentary, produced by Kino Fur Morgen in English and French (2008)

The CIA Declassified: on the 1954 coup in Guatemala, produced by the Discovery Channel (2014)

1937: The Last Year of Innocence: a documentary on travels of JFK and other notable Americans in Europe in 1937, produced by joint French-German TV venture, Meinwerk Film GmbH, based on my introduction to reissued version of 
Kennedy's first book, “Why England Slept.” (2017)

La Cour des Grands: How France joined the UN Security Council in 1945 – produced by French Channel 5 and O2B Films, in French (2017)

Cold War Code-breaking: ZDF German Public Television, documentary on code breaking during the Cold War, including the US Army Signals operations at the 1945 UN Conference in San Francisco, in German (2019)

The United Nations 75 Years On: production by China Global Television Network (CGTN), in English (Sept. 2020)

Four Died Trying: The Impact on America of the Assassinations of John Kennedy, Robert Kennedy, Malcolm X, and Martin Luther King Jr, produced by Libby Handros, NYC (October, 2020)

Kennedy (a six-hour documentary on Kennedy's life and legacy): produced by Ashton Gleckman, narrated by Peter Coyote, Blackbird Pictures, Indianapolis, Indiana (April, 2021)

A Measure of a Giant: Actor Charlton Heston's journey from liberalism to conservatism, produced by ITV France, filmed by a joint German-French Arte Channel TV venture (March, 2022)

Personal life
Schlesinger is married to Judith Elster, a journalist and teacher. Their daughter, Sarah, is an artist. He has three brothers—Andrew, an author and documentary film-maker; Robert, an author and former editor of the on-line op-ed page of U.S. News & World Report magazine; and Peter, an entertainment lawyer. His sister, Christina Schlesinger, is a painter and art teacher. His twin sister, Katherine, died in 2004. His father died in 2007 and his mother in 2017.

Bibliography
 Why England Slept by John F. Kennedy (new edition, Praeger 2016, with introduction by Stephen Schlesinger) 
 The Letters of Arthur Schlesinger Jr. (Random House 2013, co-editor)
 Journals 1952-2000 Arthur M. Schlesinger, Jr. (Penguin Press 2007, co-editor)
 Act of Creation: The Founding of The United Nations (Westview Press 2003)
 Bitter Fruit: The Story of the U.S. Coup in Guatemala (Doubleday 1982, with Stephen Kinzer)
 The New Reformers (Houghton Mifflen 1975)

He has contributed chapters to eight other books.

References

General
 Contributor profile at the Huffington Post
Specific

External links
 Official web site
  Interview on www.alrasub.com

Living people
1942 births
American people of Austrian descent
American people of English descent
American people of German-Jewish descent
Harvard Law School alumni
Phillips Exeter Academy alumni
Buckingham Browne & Nichols School alumni
Harvard College alumni